Bracewell and Brogden is a civil parish in the West Craven area of the Borough of Pendle in Lancashire, England.  According to the 2001 census it had a population of 238, increasing slightly to 244 at the 2011 census.  The parish includes Bracewell (at )  and Brogden (at ); historically, both were in the West Riding of Yorkshire.

Toponymy
Bracewell: from a personal name, either Braegd or Breiđ, + 'well' = 'spring or stream': hence, 'Braegd's/Breiđ's spring or stream' 

Brogden: 'The valley of the brook'.

History
The old Roman road from Ribchester to Ilkley passes through the parish, with the remains of a 4th-century Romano-British farmstead known as Bomber Camp located next to the boundary with Gisburn.

See also

Listed buildings in Bracewell and Brogden
Scheduled monuments in Lancashire

References

External links

History of Yorkshire
Civil parishes in Lancashire
Geography of the Borough of Pendle